O'Day is an unincorporated area and railway point in Census division 23 in Northern Manitoba, Canada.

History
O'Day was founded with the building of the Hudson Bay Railway in the third decade of the 20th century. When the originally intended final section line route to Port Nelson was abandoned, the construction of the new route of the final section from Amery north to Churchill, which opened in 1929, led to its founding. O'Day lies on the line between the settlements of Kellett to the south and Back to the north. The Broad River passes under the railway line just north of O'Day.

Transportation
O'Day is the site of O'Day railway station, served by the Via Rail Winnipeg – Churchill train.

References

Unincorporated communities in Northern Region, Manitoba